The 1939 NCAA Golf Championship was the first annual NCAA-sanctioned golf tournament to determine the individual and team national champions of men's collegiate golf in the United States. The tournament was held at the Wakonda Country Club in Des Moines, Iowa. 

Stanford captured in the inaugural team championship and Vincent D'Antoni, from Tulane, won the individual title. The Indians were coached by Eddie Twiggs. The Indians had also won the last collegiate golf championship, held at Oakmont Country Club in 1938, before the beginning of NCAA sponsorship. 

Sid Richardson of Northwestern, with a score of 144, was named the tournament's medalist.

Team results

Note: Top 10 only

References

NCAA Men's Golf Championship
Golf in Iowa
NCAA Golf Championship
NCAA Golf Championship
NCAA Golf Championship